Andrei Aleksandrovich Nikolaev (born 6 September 2000), is a Russian Paralympic swimmer who specializes in the 50–400 m S8 freestyle events.

Career
Nikolaev represented Russia at the 2019 World Para Swimming Championships and won two gold medals and one bronze medal.

He represented Russian Paralympic Committee athletes at the 2020 Summer Paralympics and won two gold medals and one silver medal.

References

Living people
2000 births
Paralympic swimmers of Russia
Medalists at the 2020 Summer Paralympics
Swimmers at the 2020 Summer Paralympics
Paralympic medalists in swimming
Paralympic gold medalists for the Russian Paralympic Committee athletes
Paralympic silver medalists for the Russian Paralympic Committee athletes
Russian male freestyle swimmers
Sportspeople from Bashkortostan
S8-classified Paralympic swimmers
21st-century Russian people